Tekkalakote, also known as Tekkalkota is a Panchayat town, and Pre-historic Neolithic site in Siruguppa taluk of Ballari district in the Indian state of Karnataka.

Demography

 India census, Tekkalakote had a population of 23,536. Males constitute 52% of the population and females 48%. 
Tekkalakote has an average literacy rate of 30%, lower than the national average of 59.5%.
Literacy of males and females are 41% and 25% respectively. The town's literacy percentage is increasing gradually.

Agriculture

Tekkalakote is one of the major paddy-growing towns in the district of Ballari. It also has three rice mills.

Major crops grown here are paddy and cotton, while Navane, chilli, bajra, jowar, and maize are grown as minor crops.

Agriculture lands are irrigated and rain-fed.

Importance
Tekkalakote is a pre-historic neolithic site and has shown an evidence of elaborate gold ear ornaments.

Tekkalakote hill has evidence of pre-historic(Neolithic) rock paintings in India along with Kupgal, Piklihal, Lakhudiyar, Bhimbetka, & Jogimara.Various relics of Neolithic age rock drawings also found here.

Tekkalakote is also known for the 18th century square-shaped fort. 

Nittur village, which is known for the minor edict of the mauryan emperor Ashoka, is located 5 km from this town. The town holds the most populated and commercial status in its Siruguppa taluk.

Transport
Tekkalakote is located in between Ballari and Siruguppa. It is 45 km away from Ballari and 11 km from Siruguppa. Tekkalakote lies on NH150A which runs between Jevargi and Chamarajanagara. The town is well connected by road to Bangalore, Gulbarga, Hyderabad, and other major cities. The nearest airport is in Vidyanagar, Ballari, currently which connects to Bengaluru and Hyderabad.

Long-distance bus routes
Karnataka State Road Transport Corporation (KSRTC) runs bus services to other cities and villages. Private transport facilities are also available.

Railways
Bellary Junction is the nearest railway station, at a distance of 45 km from this town.

Languages
Kannada, Hindi, and Telugu are the common languages known to the people.

Temples
Tekkalakote is one of the famous religious hub in Siruguppa taluk. It has many old temples and are of hundreds of years old.
These are some of the famous Temples (Devasthana) in Tekkalakote.

Varavina Malleshwar Devasthana (Popularly known as Mallayyana Gudi)

Kadasiddeshwara Devasthana

Nela Amareshwara Devasthana

Jade Shankara linga Devasthana

Nagareshwara Devasthana

Neelakanteshwara Devasthana

Siddarameshwara Devasthana

Kaalamma Devasthana

Dyavamma Devasthana

Pete Basaveswara Gudi

Sharana Basaveswhwara Kalyana Mantapa'

'Beeralingeshwar temple'

' Kote Eshwara Temple '

' Huchirappa Temple '

Hospitals
Tekkalakota has a government hospital on the main highway road. Town also has many private doctors and medical stores.

Tekkalakota is also famous for the Ayurvedic treatment practiced by some of the doctors. Some Ayurvedic doctors are providing the treatment based on the experience in this field which they got from their parents and forefathers.

Political Parties
Major Political parties are Bharatiya Janata Party (BJP), Indian National Congress (Congress) and Janata Dal

See also
Nittur, Siruguppa
Udegolam
Nadivi
Siruguppa
Bellary
Hunasagi
Piklihal

References

Cities and towns in Bellary district
Archaeological sites in Karnataka
Buildings and structures in Bellary district
Forts in Karnataka
Tourist attractions in Ballari district